The Berkeley Psychic Institute (BPI) is a school for spiritual development, founded in 1973 by Lewis S. Bostwick  in Berkeley, California and is also the workshop of the seminary of the Church of the Divine Man. The institute claims to have taught thousands of people to read auras and study channeling, one of the most popular classes being The Clairvoyant Training Program. The institute has contributed progressive ideas to the interfaith movement and has also contributed to a growth in number of enlightenment schools and metaphysical institutions. After Lewis' death in 1995, his wife, Vr. Rt. Rev Dr. Susan Hull Bostwick, assumed leadership of the institute and the church.

There are three Berkeley Psychic Institutes in Northern California, as well as several other groups throughout the world begun by former students. It has also spawned the Déjà Vu Publishing Company, responsible for the production of the Psychic Reader Magazine, as well as special events, psychic entertainment and spiritual tours.

Notable members 
Patrick McAnaney author of Dear Psychic 
 Helen Palmer, author of Enneagram of Personality-related books
 Jose Stevens, author of The Michael Teachings-related books

Affiliations 
 Church of Divine Man
 Psychic Reader Magazine
 Déjà Vu Publishing Company

References

External links
 The Berkeley Psychic Institute
 Déjà Vu Publishing Company

Religious organizations based in California
Education in Berkeley, California
1973 establishments in California
Religious organizations established in 1973
Educational institutions established in 1973